Olkhovka is a rural locality (a selo) and the administrative center of Olkhovsky District in Volgograd Oblast, Russia. Population:

References

Rural localities in Olkhovsky District
Tsaritsynsky Uyezd